Fartha is a small townland in south County Cork, Ireland. The origins of the townland are believed to be related to a burial place, land of tombs and graves. There is a ringfort and a famine village in the townland.

Economy
Fartha is home to the Joseph Walsh furniture studio.

See also
 List of townlands of the Barony of Kinalea

References

External links
 Photographs in the vicinity of Fartha

Townlands of County Cork